Due to High Expectations... The Flaming Lips are Providing Needles for Your Balloons (usually referred to as Providing Needles for Your Balloons) is a compilation record released by the American rock group The Flaming Lips in 1994.

According to the band's website, it was released because there had been new albums in 1992 and 1993, but there would not be in 1994, thus the fans were expecting new Lips material. This is probably due to the success of Transmissions from the Satellite Heart and the band's extensive promotion of that album. Released as an EP, it is a collection of unreleased studio and live recordings, some of which are covers. Despite being categorized as an EP, the release runs as long as a full album. The artwork reflects the graphic themes of Transmissions from the Satellite Heart.

Track listing

Further credits
Recorded in April 1994 by Keith Cleversley. Different mix from Clouds Taste Metallic version.
Part one can be found on the previous EP, Yeah, I Know It's a Drag... But Wastin' Pigs Is Still Radical.
Recorded for a Suicide tribute album.
Song about Wayne's brother's experience shopping at a grocery store while high.
Recorded live at Northern Lights record store in Minneapolis December 6, 1993.
Recorded live at Northern Lights record store in Minneapolis December 6, 1993. Smog cover.
Recorded live at Northern Lights record store in Minneapolis December 6, 1993. Katherine Kennicott Davis cover.
Radio broadcast, March 1994.
Hidden track: A short instrumental which would appear in its finished form on Zaireeka as "The Train Runs over the Camel but Is Derailed by the Gnat".

References

1994 EPs
The Flaming Lips EPs
The Flaming Lips compilation albums
1994 compilation albums
Warner Records compilation albums
Warner Records EPs